Elizabeth Evans Alexander is an American attorney and political advisor serving as the communications director for the First Lady of the United States, Jill Biden. She previously served as press secretary to Vice President Joe Biden from 2009 to 2011.

Early life and education
Alexander is from Cleburne, Texas. She earned a Bachelor of Arts degree in political science from Texas A&M University and a Juris Doctor from Georgetown University Law Center.

Career
Elizabeth Alexander began working for U.S. Senator Joe Biden in 2006, as communications director in his Senate office and for the Senate Foreign Relations Committee of which he was chairman. After the 2008 election, Vice President-elect Biden named her as his press secretary in December 2008, and she served in that role from his inauguration in January 2009 until June 2011. Biden announced in May of that year that she would soon be leaving his office to practice law. Alexander was succeeded by Kendra Barkoff, the former deputy communications director and press secretary to then-Secretary of the Interior Ken Salazar.

Previously, Alexander served as press secretary for the United Nations Foundation. During the 2004 general election campaign, she traveled the country as DNC Chairman Terry McAuliffe's press secretary. During the 2004 primary campaign, she served as Rep. Dick Gephardt's South Carolina press secretary. Alexander was Rep. Adam Schiff's (D-CA) communications director and deputy press secretary for U.S. Senator Chuck Schumer (D-NY).

In November 2020, Alexander was named communications director for the First Lady of the United States, Jill Biden.

References

External links

American press secretaries
Biden administration personnel
Democratic National Committee people
Georgetown University Law Center alumni
Living people
Obama administration personnel
People from Cleburne, Texas
Texas A&M University alumni
United Nations Foundation
United States Department of the Interior officials
Year of birth missing (living people)